Khurelbaataryn Bulgantuya  is a Mongolian politician currently serving as Member of State Great Khural since June 2020. Bulgantuya graduated from Yale University.

References
 

21st-century Mongolian women politicians
21st-century Mongolian politicians
1981 births
Living people
People from Arkhangai Province
Yale University alumni